The 49th Air Division is an inactive United States Air Force unit. Its last assignment was with the United States Air Forces in Europe at RAF Sculthorpe, England. It was inactivated on 1 July 1956.

History
The unit's origins begin with its predecessor, the World War II 49th Bombardment Wing, which was part of Fifteenth Air Force. The 47th engaged in heavy bombardment B-24 Liberator operations against Germany.

World War II

The 49th Air Division was established and activated at Columbia Army Air Base, South Carolina in March 1943 as a medium bomber (North American B-25 Mitchell) operational training wing. It was reassigned to Greenville Army Air Base, South Carolina in April where it commanded training of B-25 bomb groups in the southeast prior to their overseas deployment.

It was decided to redesignate the wing as the 49th Bombardment Wing (Heavy) and prepare it to command Consolidated B-24 Liberator heavy bomb groups as part of Fifteenth Air Force in late 1943. Groups assigned to the wing were the 461st and 484th Bombardment Groups, training at Hammer Field, California and Harvard Army Air Field, Nebraska. After the wing deployed to Bari, Italy in March 1944, a third group, the 451st Bombardment Group, was transferred to the wing from the 47th Bomb Wing.

As part of Fifteenth Air Force the groups of the 49th attacked such targets as oil refineries, marshalling yards, aircraft factories, bridges, and airfields in Italy, Germany, Austria, and Bulgaria. Subordinate units inflicted heavy damage on the oil refineries at Ploiești, participated in the invasion of southern France in August 1944, and supported the final advances of Allied armies in northern Italy in April 1945.

The wing was inactivated in Italy on 16 October 1945.

Cold War
Beginning in 1947, the 49th served in the Reserve for two years as a B-29 Superfortress organization, during which time it was redesignated as an Air Division and controlled the 100th Bombardment Group at Miami International Airport and the 380th Bombardment Group at MacDill Air Force Base in Florida.

As a result of the expansion of the United States Air Forces in Europe, the division moved to England and served as a command and control organization. No combat elements were assigned, but the 20th Fighter-Bomber Wing (RAF Wethersfield); the 47th Bombardment Wing (RAF Sculthorpe) and the 81st Fighter-Bomber Wing at RAF Bentwaters were attached for operations.

The division supervised and participated in numerous training missions such as Quick Shot, Kingpin, and Bear Claw before it was inactivated on 1 July 1956 as a result of a budgetary reduction.

Lineage
 Established as the 49th Bombardment Operational Training Wing (Medium) on 17 March 1943
 Activated on 31 March 1943
 Redesignated 49th Bombardment Wing (Medium) on 18 October 1943
 Redesignated 49th Bombardment Wing (Heavy) on 4 December 1943
 Redesignated 49th Bombardment Wing, Heavy c. August 1944
 Inactivated on 16 October 1945
 Activated in the Reserve as 49th Bombardment Wing, Very Heavy on 20 December 1946
 Redesignated 49th Air Division, Bombardment on 16 April 1948
 Inactivated on 27 June 1949
 Redesignated 49th Air Division on 25 October 1951
 Activated on 7 November 1951
 Redesignated 49th Air Division, Operational on 1 April 1952
 Redesignated 49th Air Division (Operational) on 15 November 1954
 Inactivated on 1 July 1956

Assignments
 Third Air Force, 31 March 1943 – c. 3 February 1944
 Army Service Forces, Port of Embarkation, c. 3 February 1944;
 Fifteenth Air Force, c. 11 March 1944 – 16 October 1945
 Fourteenth Air Force, 20 December 1946
 Ninth Air Force, 22 December 1948
 Fourteenth Air Force, 1 February – 27 June 1949
 Tactical Air Command, 7 November 1951
 Third Air Force, 5 June 1952 – 1 July 1956

Components
Wings
 20th Fighter-Bomber Wing: attached 12 February 1952 – 1 July 1956
 47th Bombardment Wing: attached 12 February 1952 – 1 July 1956
 81st Fighter-Interceptor Wing (later 81st Fighter-Bomber Wing): attached 1 March 1954 – 1 July 1956

Groups
 100th Bombardment Group: 29 May 1947 – 27 June 1949
 380th Bombardment Group: 17 October 1947 – 27 June 1949
 451st Bombardment Group: c. 6 April 1944 – c.19 June 1945
 461st Bombardment Group: c. 30 April 1944 – c.1 July 1945
 484th Bombardment Group: c. 6 April 1944 – c.25 May 1945

Stations
 Columbia Army Air Base, South Carolina, 31 March 1943
 Greenville Army Air Base, South Carolina, c. 28 April 1943 – 2 February 1944
 Bari, Italy, 9 March 1944
 Naples, Italy, 9 April 1944
 Incoronata, Italy, c. 11 April 1944 – 16 October 1945
 Miami Army Air Field (later Miami International Airport), Florida, 20 December 1946 – 27 June 1949
 Langley Air Force Base, Virginia, 7 November 1951 – 21 May 1952
 RAF Sculthorpe, England, 1 June 1952 – 1 July 1956

Aircraft
 Consolidated B-24 Liberator 1944 – 1945
 Republic F-84 Thunderjet 1952 – 1956
 North American B-45 Tornado 1954 – 1956
 North American RB-45 Tornado 1954 – 1956

References

Notes
 Explanatory notes

 Citations

Bibliography

 
 

Military units and formations established in 1943
European theatre of World War II
Conflicts in 1945
World War II strategic bombing units
049